Bickham's little yellow bat (Rhogeessa bickhami) is a species of vesper bat found in Central America.

Taxonomy and etymology
It was described as a new species in 2012. The eponym for the species name "bickhami" is John W. Bickham, who has researched other bat species of this genus, as well as other mammals.

Description
It is a diploid organism with two sets of each chromosome (2n=34).

Biology and ecology
It is insectivorous, catching and consuming insects while flying.

It is found in Costa Rica, El Salvador, Guatemala, Honduras, Mexico, and Nicaragua.

As of 2017, it is evaluated as a least-concern species by the IUCN.

References

Rhogeessa
Mammals described in 2012
Bats of Central America